The 1897 Yale Bulldogs football team was an American football team that represented Yale University as an independent during the 1897 college football season. The team finished with a 9–0–2 record, shut out seven of eleven opponents, and outscored all opponents by a total of 170 to 35. Frank Butterworth was the head coach.

There was no contemporaneous system in 1895 for determining a national champion. However, Yale was retroactively named as the co-national champion by Parke H. Davis. Most selectors designated Penn (perfect 15–0 record) as the national champion for 1897; Yale and Penn did not play during the 1897 season.

Four Yale players were selected as consensus first-team players on the 1897 All-America team. The team's consensus All-Americans were: quarterback Charles de Saulles; end John A. Hall; guard Gordon Brown; and tackle Burr Chamberlain. Other notable players included halfback Charles T. Dudley, fullback Malcolm McBride, center George Cadwalader, guard Charles Chadwick, and tackle James O. Rodgers.

Schedule

References

Yale
Yale Bulldogs football seasons
College football national champions
College football undefeated seasons
Yale Bulldogs football